Desmanthus illinoensis, commonly known as Illinois bundleflower, prairie-mimosa or prickleweed, is a common plant in many areas of the south central and Midwestern US.

Habitat
It can often be found growing on the sides of roads, particularly on southern exposures, needing full sun and ample moisture during its short growing season. The mature plants often grow and flower in mowed areas. In many parts of it's native habitat, road sides are only mowed twice a year. In the late spring and again in late fall. The early mowing helps clear away competitors that might impede growth. The late mowing chops up the dry seed pods resulting in some scarification and resulting in better germination. 

USDA Zones 5-8 are recommended for outside cultivation. The waxy seed coat needs to be scarified prior to planting.

Chemistry 

Root bark of D. illinoensis has been found to contain N,N-DMT, NMT, N-hydroxy-N-methyltryptamine, 2-hydroxy-N-methyltryptamine, and gramine (toxic).

Nutritional benefits
The plant is nutritious and high in protein.

The Land Institute in Salina, Kansas has done extensive research into the food uses of the seeds of this plant.  Studies found the dry seeds composed of 38% protein, compared to 40% for soybeans.

Ayahuasca analogue
To produce prairiehuasca, the root bark is mixed with a native source of beta-Carbolines (e.g., passion flower in North America) to produce a hallucinogenic plant concoction analogous to the shamanic South American brew ayahuasca.

References

External links
 
 Erowid Desmanthus Vault

Mimosoids
Flora of Virginia
Edible nuts and seeds
Ayahuasca analogs